Bangkok Shocks, Saigon Shakes, Hanoi Rocks is the first studio album by the Finnish rock band Hanoi Rocks, released in 1981.

Bangkok Shocks, Saigon Shakes, Hanoi Rocks was recorded in January 1981, between Hanoi Rocks' club shows. While the album was produced by Andy McCoy and Michael Monroe under the name "The Muddy Twins" (inspired by "The Glimmer Twins"), the album was recorded by Swedish Seppo Johansson, who worked at the studio. Even though the album is regarded by many as good, Andy McCoy commented in the December, 1981 issue of Soundi that Johansson ruined many of the songs. Also Michael Monroe says that he can't listen to his singing on the first Hanoi-album, as his voice wasn't very good yet.

The album was originally going to be titled Some Like It Hot or Some Like It Cut, but Jim Pembroke suggested the name Bangkok Shocks, Saigon Shakes, Hanoi Rocks, which the band ultimately chose.

The biggest hit of the album was "Tragedy". "Walking With My Angel" is a cover of a song from 1961 by Bobby Vee. "Don't Never Leave Me" was re-recorded and released as "Don't You Ever Leave Me" on Hanoi Rocks' fifth album Two Steps from the Move.

The album appears several times in the 2000 film High Fidelity. The song "11th Street Kids" was featured in the episode titled "Monkey Dory" of the 2022 HBO Max original series Peacemaker.

Track listing

Personnel 
Hanoi Rocks
 Michael Monroe – vocals, piano, saxophone (3, 9, 10), harmonica (5)
 Andy McCoy – guitars, backing vocals
 Nasty Suicide – guitars, backing vocals
 Sam Yaffa – bass
 Gyp Casino – drums

Chart positions

Album

References

External links 
 

Hanoi Rocks albums
1981 debut albums